Rolf Wanka (14 February 1901 – 28 November 1982) was an Austrian actor.

Biography
He was of Czech, German and French origin. His father was Dr. Josef Wanka was head physician in Vienna. His mother was Emma Pippich. His family owned a mansion in Hřiměždice, Czechoslovakia, where he spent a lot of time. He studied Technical University in Prague, then University in Insbruck. He spoke German, Czech, French and English. He appeared as a leading man in many Austrian, German and Czech movies. He was married three times and had two children. His second wife was the actress Friedl Czepa.

Selected filmography

 M (1931) - Man (uncredited)
 Wehe, wenn er losgelassen (1932) - Der heilige Petrus
 Pozdní máj (1934) - Ing. Nedbal
 Matka Kráčmerka (1934) - MUC. Václav Zdeborský
 Die törichte Jungfrau (1935) - Anton Rabeling
 The World's in Love (1935) - Peter, sein Sohn
 Buchhalter Schnabel (1935) - Hans Binder
 Circus Saran (1935) - Kurt von Herdegen
 Polibek ve sněhu (1935) - Petr Bard
 Liebe auf Bretteln (1935) - Peter Bard
 Hilde Petersen postlagernd (1936) - Dr. Victor Franke - Lawyer
 Divoch (1936) - Mirko Rolín
 Arme kleine Inge (1936, German-language version of Sextánka) - Professor Strom
 Father Vojtěch (1936) - Father Vojtěch Dvorecký
 Srdce v soumraku (1936) - Pavel Vach
 Irca's Romance (1936) - Lexa Hora
 Not a Word About Love (1937, German-language version of Poslíček lásky) - Hubert Kersten - Modeschöpfer
 Sextánka (1937) - Prof. Jirí Hron
 Výdělečné ženy (1937) - Ing. Marek
 Escape to the Adriatic (1937, German-language version of Irca's Romance) - Fred Bergen - Monteur
 Poslíček lásky (1937) - Pavel Toman
 Lízin let do nebe (1937) - Dr. Petr Tumlir
 Krok do tmy (1938) - Ronny
 Heiraten – aber wen? (1938) - Dr. Felix Hübner
 Rote Rosen – blaue Adria (1938, German-language version of Divoch) - Peter Danner
 Alert in the Mediterranean (1938) - von Schlieden
 Linen from Ireland (1939) - Dr. Goll
 Dein Leben gehört mir (1939)
 The Right to Love (1939) - Martin Förchinger, sein Förster u. Verwalter
 My Daughter Doesn't Do That (1940) - Georg Bartenberg
 Anuschka (1942) - Dr. Sascha Wendt
 Orizzonte di sangue (1942) - Sergio
 Hundstage (1944) - Dr. Peter Kirchner
 Umwege zu dir (1947)
 Gruß und Kuß aus der Wachau (1950) - Ulrich Kürenberg
 The Magic Face (1951) - Gen. Rodenbusch
 Maria Theresa (1951) - Oberstkämmerer Khevenhüller
 Wienerinnen (1952)
 Die Fiakermilli (1953) - Major Graf Eggern
 The Poacher (1953) - Prosecutor
 Stars Over Colombo (1953) - Prosecutor
 Franz Schubert (1953) - Franz Schober
 Street Serenade (1953)
 The Prisoner of the Maharaja (1954) - Prosecutor
 The Red Prince (1954) - Rittmeister Graf Daun
 Nel gorgo del peccato (1954)
 The Silent Angel (1954) - Kats
 Hochstaplerin der Liebe (1954) - Baron Goutten
 Ball of Nations (1954) - Brambachen
 Klisura (1956) - Mihael
 Miedo (1956) - Arturo Spiegel
 Todos somos necesarios (1956) - Marcos Alberola
 Embajadores en el Infierno (1956) - Mikhail
 La mestiza (1956) - Álex
 Three Birch Trees on the Heath (1956) - Ernö, Zigeunerprimas
 Viaje de novios (1956) - Luis
 The Battalion in the Shadows (1957) - Narrador
 Horas de pánico (1957)
  (1958)
 The Priest and the Girl (1958) - Fiori
 A Gift for Heidi (1958) - Mr. Binder
  (1959)
 For Love and Others (1959) - Senor Ravella
 Die schöne Lügnerin (1959) - Graf Waldau Senior / Count Waldau Sr.
  (1959) - Leopold I, Holy Roman Emperor
 X-25 javlja (1960)
 Three Men in a Boat (1961) - Dr. Flüeli

 Auf Wiedersehen am blauen Meer (1962) - Anulfi
 Captain Sindbad (1963) - The King
 Der Chef wünscht keine Zeugen (1964)
 Sünde mit Rabatt (1968) - Kurt
 Wer weint denn schon im Freudenhaus? (1970) - Gerichtspräsident Lehmann
 Josefine Mutzenbacher II – Meine 365 Liebhaber (1971) - Dr. Frischauer
 Wenn mein Schätzchen auf die Pauke haut (1971) - A. R. Werner
 Paragraph 218 – Wir haben abgetrieben, Herr Staatsanwalt (1971)
 The Internecine Project (1974) - Art Dealer
 The Desert of the Tartars (1976) - Prosdocimo

References

External links
 

1901 births
1982 deaths
Austrian male film actors
Male actors from Vienna
20th-century Austrian male actors